One More Try may refer to:

 "One More Try" (George Michael song)
 "One More Try" (Timmy T. song)
 "One More Try" (Kristine W song)
 "One More Try" (Rolling Stones song)
 "One More Try" (Brighton Rock song)
 One More Try (film), a 2012 Filipino film
 "One More Try", a 1994 song by Richard Marx from Paid Vacation